The 1853 Ohio gubernatorial election was held on October 11, 1853.

Incumbent Democratic Governor William Medill defeated Whig nominee Nelson Barrere and Free Soil nominee Samuel Lewis.

General election

Candidates
Major party candidates
William Medill, Democratic, incumbent Governor
Nelson Barrere, Whig, former U.S. Representative

Minor party candidates
Samuel Lewis, Free Soil, Liberty Party nominee for Governor in 1846, Free Soil nominee for Governor in 1851

Results

Notes

References

1853
Ohio
Gubernatorial